The Open Book is the fourth album by American rapper Hush. It was released July 20, 2009, via Restraining Order Records.

Track listing

References

External links 

2009 albums
Hush (rapper) albums